The 1941 Rhode Island State Rams football team was an American football team that represented Rhode Island State College (later renamed the University of Rhode Island) as a member of the New England Conference during the 1941 college football season. In its first season under head coach Bill Beck, the team compiled a 5–2–1 record (2–0 against conference opponents) and won the New England Conference championship. The team played its home games at Meade Stadium in Kingston, Rhode Island.

Schedule

References

Rhode Island
Rhode Island Rams football seasons
1941 in sports in Rhode Island